Amity Township is a township in Page County, Iowa, USA.

History
Amity Township was established in 1858.

References

Townships in Page County, Iowa
Townships in Iowa
Populated places established in 1858